The 2020 Purdue Fort Wayne Mastodons baseball team was a baseball team that represented Purdue University Fort Wayne in the 2020 NCAA Division I baseball season. The Mastodons were members of the Summit League and played their home games at Mastodon Field in Fort Wayne, Indiana. They were led by first-year head coach Doug Schreiber.

The season was cut short in stages by March 12 due to the COVID-19 pandemic.

Previous season
The Mastodons finished the 2019 NCAA Division I baseball season 7–45 overall (2–28 conference) and sixth place in conference standings. Following the conclusion of the regular season, the Mastodons failed to qualify to play in the 2019 NCAA Tournament.

Preseason
On July 3, 2019, Bobby Pierce stepped down as the head coach at Purdue Fort Wayne. On July 23, 2019, former Purdue University head coach, Doug Schreiber was named the Mastodons new head coach. On August 28, 2019, Schreiber named Lafayette Aviators manager, Brent McNeil, the team's pitching coach. On October 3, 2019, Schreiber finalized his staff with the hiring of Ken Jones and Gordon Cardenas.

Preseason Summit poll
For the 2020 poll, Purdue Fort Wayne was projected to finish in sixth in the Conference.

Roster

Schedule

! style="" | Regular Season
|- valign="top" 

|- bgcolor="#ccffcc"
| 1 || February 14 || at  || Bolding Stadium • Farmville, Virginia, || 10–8 || Boyd (1–0) || Berrier (0–1) || Ferguson (1) || 283 || 1–0 || –
|- bgcolor="#ccffcc"
| 2 || February 15 || at Longwood || Bolding Stadium • Farmville, Virginia || 8–3 || Phelps (1–0) || D'Ercole (0–1) || None || 108 || 2–0 || –
|- bgcolor="#ccffcc"
| 3 || February 15 || at Longwood || Bolding Stadium • Farmville, Virginia || 11–0 || Kissinger (1–0) || Potojecki (0–1) || None || 108 || 3–0 || –
|- bgcolor="#ffcccc"
| 4 || February 16 || at Longwood || Bolding Stadium • Farmville, Virginia || 8–11 || Gregory (1–0) || Miller (0–1) || Fuchs (1) || 278 || 3–1 || –
|- bgcolor="#ffcccc"
| 5 || February 21 || at  || Hayden Park • Oxford, Ohio, || 2–6 || Bachman (1–1) || Boyd (1–1) || None || 108 || 3–2 || –
|- bgcolor="#ffcccc"
| 6 || February 22 || at Miami (OH) || Hayden Park • Oxford, Ohio || 3–7 || Bosma (1–1) || Phelps (1–1) || Webb (1) || 209 || 3–3 || –
|- bgcolor="#ffcccc"
| 7 || February 23 || at Miami (OH) || Hayden Park • Oxford, Ohio || 8–18 || Schmitt (1–0) || Kissinger (1–1) || None || 180 || 3–4 || –
|- bgcolor="#ffcccc"
| 8 || February 28 || at  || Presley Askew Field • Las Cruces, New Mexico || 2–4 || Hroch (2–0) || Boyd (1–2) || Allen (1) || 1,046 || 3–5 || –
|- bgcolor="#ffcccc"
| 9 || February 29 || at New Mexico State || Presley Askew Field • Las Cruces, New Mexico || 5–19 || Fernandez (1–0) || Phelps (1–2) || Dickson Jr. (1) || 723 || 3–6 || –
|- bgcolor="#ffcccc"
| 10 || February 29 || at New Mexico State || Presley Askew Field • Las Cruces, New Mexico || 5–14 || Barraza (1–0) || Kissinger (1–2) || None || 735 || 3–7 || –
|-

|- bgcolor="#ffcccc"
| 11 || March 1 || at New Mexico State || Presley Askew Field • Las Cruces, New Mexico || 9–10 || Reyes (2–1) || Lawvere (0–1) || None || 622 || 3–8 || –
|- bgcolor="#ffcccc"
| 12 || March 6 || vs  || Shipyard Park • Charleston, South Carolina, || 4–13 || Miller (2–0) || Kissinger (1–3) || None || 102 || 3–9 || –
|- bgcolor="#ccffcc"
| 13 || March 7 || vs Longwood || Shipyard Park • Charleston, South Carolina || 9–4 || Boyd (2–2) || Gregory (1–2) || Phelps (1) || 123 || 4–9 || –
|- bgcolor="#ccffcc"
| 14 || March 8 || vs  || Shipyard Park • Charleston, South Carolina || 8–7 || Miller (1–1) || Kramer (0–2) || Evenson (1) || 132 || 5–9 || –
|- bgcolor="#ffcccc"
| 15 || March 10 || at  || Ball Diamond • Muncie, Indiana || 4–9 || Ruetschle (1–0) || Phelps (1–3) || Schweitzer (1) || 268 || 5–10 || –
|- bgcolor="#bbbbbb"
| 16 || March 13 || at  || Alfred D. Boyer Stadium • Macomb, Illinois, || colspan=7| Canceled (COVID-19 pandemic)
|- bgcolor="#bbbbbb"
| 17 || March 14 || at Western Illinois || Alfred D. Boyer Stadium • Macomb, Illinois || colspan=7| Canceled (COVID-19 pandemic)
|- bgcolor="#bbbbbb"
| 18 || March 15 || at Western Illinois || Alfred D. Boyer Stadium • Macomb, Illinois || colspan=7| Canceled (COVID-19 pandemic)
|- bgcolor="#bbbbbb"
| 19 || March 18 || at Ball State || Ball Diamond • Muncie, Indiana || colspan=7| Canceled (COVID-19 pandemic)
|- bgcolor="#bbbbbb"
| 20 || March 20 || at  || J. J. Isaacson Field at Seymour Smith Park • Omaha, Nebraska, || – || – || – || – || – || – || –
|- bgcolor="#bbbbbb"
| 21 || March 21 || at Omaha || J. J. Isaacson Field at Seymour Smith Park • Omaha, Nebraska || – || – || – || – || – || – || –
|- bgcolor="#bbbbbb"
| 22 || March 22 || at Omaha || J. J. Isaacson Field at Seymour Smith Park • Omaha, Nebraska || – || – || – || – || – || – || –
|- bgcolor="#bbbbbb"
| 23 || March 24 || at Purdue || Alexander Field • West Lafayette, Indiana || colspan=7| Canceled (COVID-19 pandemic)
|- bgcolor="#bbbbbb"
| 24 || March 27 ||  || Mastodon Field • Fort Wayne, Indiana || colspan=7| Canceled (COVID-19 pandemic)
|- bgcolor="#bbbbbb"
| 25 || March 28 || North Dakota State || Mastodon Field • Fort Wayne, Indiana || colspan=7| Canceled (COVID-19 pandemic)
|- bgcolor="#bbbbbb"
| 26 || March 29 || North Dakota State || Mastodon Field • Fort Wayne, Indiana || colspan=7| Canceled (COVID-19 pandemic)
|- bgcolor="#bbbbbb"
| 27 || March 31 ||  || Mastodon Field • Fort Wayne, Indiana || colspan=7| Canceled (COVID-19 pandemic)
|-

|- bgcolor="#bbbbbb"
| 28 || April 1 || at  || Woerner Field • Dayton, Ohio, || colspan=7| Canceled (COVID-19 pandemic)
|- bgcolor="#bbbbbb"
| 29 || April 3 || Western Illinois || Mastodon Field • Fort Wayne, Indiana || colspan=7| Canceled (COVID-19 pandemic)
|- bgcolor="#bbbbbb"
| 30 || April 4 || Western Illinois || Mastodon Field • Fort Wayne, Indiana || colspan=7| Canceled (COVID-19 pandemic)
|- bgcolor="#bbbbbb"
| 31 || April 5 || Western Illinois || Mastodon Field • Fort Wayne, Indiana || colspan=7| Canceled (COVID-19 pandemic)
|- bgcolor="#bbbbbb"
| 32 || April 7 ||  || Mastodon Field • Fort Wayne, Indiana || colspan=7| Canceled (COVID-19 pandemic)
|- bgcolor="#bbbbbb"
| 33 || April 10 ||  || Mastodon Field • Fort Wayne, Indiana || colspan=7| Canceled (COVID-19 pandemic)
|- bgcolor="#bbbbbb"
| 34 || April 11 || South Dakota State || Mastodon Field • Fort Wayne, Indiana || colspan=7| Canceled (COVID-19 pandemic)
|- bgcolor="#bbbbbb"
| 35 || April 12 || South Dakota State || Mastodon Field • Fort Wayne, Indiana || colspan=7| Canceled (COVID-19 pandemic)
|- bgcolor="#bbbbbb"
| 36 || April 15 || at Toledo || Scott Park Baseball Complex • Toledo, Ohio, || colspan=7| Canceled (COVID-19 pandemic)
|- bgcolor="#bbbbbb"
| 37 || April 17 || at  || J. L. Johnson Stadium • Tulsa, Oklahoma || colspan=7| Canceled (COVID-19 pandemic)
|- bgcolor="#bbbbbb"
| 38 || April 18 || at Oral Roberts || J. L. Johnson Stadium • Tulsa, Oklahoma || colspan=7| Canceled (COVID-19 pandemic)
|- bgcolor="#bbbbbb"
| 39 || April 19 || at Oral Roberts || J. L. Johnson Stadium • Tulsa, Oklahoma || colspan=7| Canceled (COVID-19 pandemic)
|- bgcolor="#bbbbbb"
| 40 || April 22 ||  || Mastodon Field • Fort Wayne, Indiana || colspan=7| Canceled (COVID-19 pandemic)
|- bgcolor="#bbbbbb"
| 41 || April 24 || at North Dakota State || Newman Outdoor Field • Fargo, North Dakota || colspan=7| Canceled (COVID-19 pandemic)
|- bgcolor="#bbbbbb"
| 42 || April 25 || at North Dakota State || Newman Outdoor Field • Fargo, North Dakota || colspan=7| Canceled (COVID-19 pandemic)
|- bgcolor="#bbbbbb"
| 43 || April 26 || at North Dakota State || Newman Outdoor Field • Fargo, North Dakota || colspan=7| Canceled (COVID-19 pandemic)
|- bgcolor="#bbbbbb"
| 44 || April 28 || at Bowling Green || Steller Field • Bowling Green, Ohio, || colspan=7| Canceled (COVID-19 pandemic)
|-

|- bgcolor="#bbbbbb"
| 45 || May 1 || Omaha || Mastodon Field • Fort Wayne, Indiana || colspan=7| Canceled (COVID-19 pandemic)
|- bgcolor="#bbbbbb"
| 46 || May 2 || Omaha || Mastodon Field • Fort Wayne, Indiana || colspan=7| Canceled (COVID-19 pandemic)
|- bgcolor="#bbbbbb"
| 47 || May 3 || Omaha || Mastodon Field • Fort Wayne, Indiana || colspan=7| Canceled (COVID-19 pandemic)
|- bgcolor="#bbbbbb"
| 48 || May 8 || Oral Roberts || Mastodon Field • Fort Wayne, Indiana || colspan=7| Canceled (COVID-19 pandemic)
|- bgcolor="#bbbbbb"
| 49 || May 9 || Oral Roberts || Mastodon Field • Fort Wayne, Indiana || colspan=7| Canceled (COVID-19 pandemic)
|- bgcolor="#bbbbbb"
| 50 || May 10 || Oral Roberts || Mastodon Field • Fort Wayne, Indiana || colspan=7| Canceled (COVID-19 pandemic)
|- bgcolor="#bbbbbb"
| 51 || May 12 || Dayton || Mastodon Field • Fort Wayne, Indiana || colspan=7| Canceled (COVID-19 pandemic)
|- bgcolor="#bbbbbb"
| 52 || May 14 || at South Dakota State || Erv Huether Field • Brookings, South Dakota || colspan=7| Canceled (COVID-19 pandemic)
|- bgcolor="#bbbbbb"
| 53 || May 15 || at South Dakota State || Erv Huether Field • Brookings, South Dakota || colspan=7| Canceled (COVID-19 pandemic)
|- bgcolor="#bbbbbb"
| 54 || May 16 || at South Dakota State || Erv Huether Field • Brookings, South Dakota || colspan=7| Canceled (COVID-19 pandemic)
|-

Awards and honors

Weekly awards

See also
 2020 NCAA Division I baseball tournament

References

Purdue Fort Wayne
Purdue Fort Wayne Mastodons baseball seasons
Purdue Fort Wayne